The 2018 Toyota 86 Racing Series was an Australian motor racing competition for Toyota 86 cars. The series began on 20 April at Phillip Island Grand Prix Circuit and concluded on 25 November at Newcastle Street Circuit. It was the third running of the Toyota 86 Racing Series. Defending series winner, Jimmy Vernon elected not to defend his title, choosing to contest the 2018 Porsche GT3 Cup Challenge Australia instead.

The series was won by Tim Brook.

Teams and drivers 
The following teams and drivers contested the series:

Calendar 
The calendar for the 2018 series was announced on the 3rd of November, 2017. The series began on 20 April at Phillip Island Grand Prix Circuit and concluded on 25 November at Newcastle Street Circuit.

Series standings
The series was won by Tim Brook.

References

External links
 

Toyota 86 Racing Series
Toyota 86 Racing Series